The Escuelas Pías de San Fernando is a building located in Madrid, Spain. It was formerly a church that burned down during the Spanish civil war. The ruins have been converted into a UNED university library. It was declared Bien de Interés Cultural in 1996.

References 

Buildings and structures in Embajadores neighborhood, Madrid
Bien de Interés Cultural landmarks in Madrid